Dmitry Tursunov was the defending champion; however, he didn't play this year.
Qualifier Michał Przysiężny won this tournament, after defeating Stéphane Bohli 4–6, 6–4, 6–1 in the final.

Seeds

Draw

Finals

Top half

Bottom half

References
 Main Draw
 Qualifying Draw

IPP Open - Singles
IPP Open